Con Greaney was a traditional Irish singer from Athea, West Limerick. He was renowned for having a huge store of songs and for having an unadulterated traditional style. Greaney was particularly associated with the comic singing tradition. One reviewer described him, saying, "Full of fun, good humour and devilment, he was a widely loved character whose animated delivery of songs invariably guaranteed him standing ovations at public performances nationwide."

Recordings
'Traditional Singer', Oidhreacht, 1991, OIDH 002, including tracks 'My Cock Crew' and 'Around the Hills of Clare'
'Cascades Of Song', Various Singers, 'A Tinker I Am' sung by Con Greaney (written by Sean Carthy, Catalogue Number: CFTS001, Claddagh Records, 2008 
'The Road to Athea', Clo Iar Chonnachta, CIC 082
 My Trousers Turned Back
 The Milltown Boy
 Carlow Town
 Will I Ever Forget The Day	
 Ar Éirinn Ní Neosfainn Cé hÍ	
 The Road To Athea	
 Eileen O	
 The Vales of New Dirreen	
 The Cheese	
 Nancy Hogan
Con Greaney was also recorded by the Irish Traditional Music Archive.

References

Irish male singers
Irish folk singers
Living people
Year of birth missing (living people)